Folk Dance Ensemble Sanok (in Polish: Zespół Tańca Ludowego "Sanok") - is one of the regional Polish folk ensembles. It is based in Sanok. 

The group was formed in 1993 as a part of then Folk Dance Ensemble Autosan (e. 1960s) and Cultural House in Sanok.

External links
 Official website

References 
Inline:

Sanok
Polish dances
Polish music
Polish folk groups